The Waterfront Beach Resort is a 290-room hotel and resort located in Huntington Beach, California. The hotel is owned by Robert Mayer Corp., an Irvine-based family-operated company.

History
The Hilton Waterfront Beach Resort opened in July 1990, constructed at a cost of $55 million.

In February 2016, the owner announced a $140 million expansion and renovation project to add a nine-story suite-only tower, containing 151 suites, 14,000 square feet of meeting space, a restaurant, a spa, and other amenities. The new Twin Dolphin Tower was opened in 2017. The project was completed by the end of 2019 after the opening of a 8,000-square-foot spa. At the conclusion of renovations, the hotel was renamed The Waterfront Beach Resort.

References

External links
 The Waterfront Beach Resort official website
 The Waterfront Beach Resort official Hilton chain website

Buildings and structures in Huntington Beach, California
Hotels in California
Resorts in California
Tourist attractions in Orange County, California
Waterfront Beach Resort
Hotels established in 1990
Hotel buildings completed in 1990